La Salina may refer to:

 La Salina, Casanare, Colombia
 La Salina, Baja California, Mexico

See also 
 La Saline, Missouri, United States